Musella lasiocarpa (syn. Musa lasiocarpa), commonly known as Chinese dwarf banana, golden lotus banana or Chinese yellow banana, is the sole species in the genus Musella. It is thus a close relative of bananas, and also a member of the family Musaceae.

Distribution and habitat
The plant is native to Sichuan, Guizhou and Yunnan Provinces in China, where it grows high in the mountains up to an altitude of 2500 m.

Description
It is known for its erect, yellow pseudostems (see image), generally appearing during the second year of cultivation, that can last a few months. Just before opening, the yellow, flower-like pseudostem resembles a lotus - from which the plant gets one of its names.

Horticulture
Under its synonym Musa lasiocarpa, this plant has won the Royal Horticultural Society's Award of Garden Merit. It can be grown outside, but requires protection from freezing temperatures.

References

External links
 Bananas.org: Musella lasiocarpa

Musaceae
Flora of Yunnan
Flora of Sichuan
Flora of Guizhou
Trees of China